Mauricio Sahuí Rivero (born 8 February 1976) is a Mexican politician affiliated with the PRI. He served as Deputy of the LXII Legislature of the Mexican Congress representing Yucatán, and previously served on the Congress of Yucatán.

Sahuí Rivero was the PRI coalition candidate in the 2018 Yucatán gubernatorial election, finishing second behind Mauricio Vila Dosal with 36 percent of the vote.

References

1976 births
Living people
Politicians from Yucatán (state)
People from Mérida, Yucatán
Institutional Revolutionary Party politicians
21st-century Mexican politicians
Members of the Congress of Yucatán
Universidad Autónoma de Yucatán alumni
Deputies of the LXII Legislature of Mexico
Members of the Chamber of Deputies (Mexico) for Yucatán